Christina "Kiki" Cutter (born July 24, 1949) is a former World Cup alpine ski racer from the United States. She was the first American to win a World Cup event, a slalom race in Oslo, Norway, on February 25, 1968.
Although Cutter competed on the World Cup circuit for less than three years, her five career victories led the U.S. alpine team for eleven years, surpassed by Phil Mahre in 1979.

Early years
Born in central Oregon in Bend, Cutter learned to ski and race at Mount Bachelor, known as "Bachelor Butte" until 1983. She was one of six children of Dr. Robert Cutter and Jane Cutter, who relocated to Bend from the Midwest in 1948, and Kiki was the first in the family born in Oregon. Cutter was a junior racer at Mount Bachelor and gained recognition for her abilities; she won the U.S. junior downhill championship in 1967 at age 17.

Racing career
Not originally on the World Cup or Olympic teams in 1968, Cutter, age 18, and Judy Nagel, age 16, were brought over to Europe in January, a few weeks ahead of the Olympics, to compete for berths on the U.S. Olympic team, which they both made. Cutter competed with the team at the Grenoble Olympics in 1968 and the World Championships in 1970. In the 1968 games, she placed higher than any American woman and was the only American woman to ski in all three events—slalom, giant slalom, and downhill. Following the Olympic competition, her rise to stardom continued in Norway, with her first World Cup victory at age 18. Cutter finished ninth in the overall standings in 1968. With three World Cup wins the next year (giant slalom at Oberstaufen, West Germany, and slalom victories at Mount St. Anne, Quebec, and Waterville Valley, New Hampshire), she finished fourth in the overall standings and second in slalom in 1969. Cutter won her fifth and final World Cup race at St. Gervais, France, in 1970. During her brief amateur career, Cutter had five World Cup victories, twelve podiums, and 25 top-10 finishes, all in the technical events, with one victory and two podiums in giant slalom and the rest in slalom.  After the 1970 World Championships in mid-February, Cutter retired from international competition at age 20. She raced professionally on the Women's Pro Tour in North America for several years.

World Cup results

Season standings

Points were only awarded for top ten finishes (see scoring system).

Race podiums
 5 wins - (4 slalom, 1 giant slalom)
 12 podiums - (10 slalom, 2 giant slalom)

Olympic results

Personal life
From 1971 to 1973, Cutter was married to Bob Beattie, coach of the U.S. Ski Team and later skiing promoter and television commentator.

Cutter participated in two nationally televised women's Superstars competitions, where she placed third and fourth.  She helped create the Kiki Cutter World Cup Ski Racing Scholarship in 1993 to help develop careers for youth ski racers. Cutter appeared in Bausch & Lomb advertisements for Ray-Ban sunglasses in the late 1980s.

She lives in Oregon, in her hometown of Bend, and is the founder, publisher, and president of Bend Living magazine.

References

External links
 
 Kiki Cutter World Cup standings at the International Ski Federation
 
 
 
 Christina Cutter at U.S. Ski and Snowboard Hall of Fame
 Kiki Cutter at Colorado Ski Museum Hall of Fame
 Kiki Cutter at Colorado Ski Hall of Fame

American female alpine skiers
Alpine skiers at the 1968 Winter Olympics
Olympic alpine skiers of the United States
Sportspeople from Bend, Oregon
1951 births
Living people
21st-century American women